The white-rumped babbler (Turdoides leucopygia) is a species of bird in the family Leiothrichidae.
It is found in Eritrea, Ethiopia, Somalia and South Sudan.

Habitat
In the mountains of Degua Tembien, the species is found in bushland, scrubland and dense secondary forest, often near cliffs, gorges or water.

References

Collar, N. J. & Robson, C. 2007. Family Timaliidae (Babblers)  pp. 70 – 291 in; del Hoyo, J., Elliott, A. & Christie, D.A. eds. Handbook of the Birds of the World, Vol. 12. Picathartes to Tits and Chickadees. Lynx Edicions, Barcelona.

white-rumped babbler
Birds of the Horn of Africa
white-rumped babbler
Taxonomy articles created by Polbot